Semiricinula turbinoides is a species of sea snail, a marine gastropod mollusk in the family Muricidae, the murex snails or rock snails.

Description

Distribution
This marine species occurs off the Solomon Islands.

References

  Claremont M., Vermeij G.J., Williams S.T. & Reid D.G. (2013) Global phylogeny and new classification of the Rapaninae (Gastropoda: Muricidae), dominant molluscan predators on tropical rocky seashores. Molecular Phylogenetics and Evolution 66: 91–102.
 Raven, J.G.M. (H.). (2016). Notes on molluscs from NW Borneo. 3. A revision of Taurasia (Gastropoda, Muricidae) and Preangeria (Gastropoda, Buccinidae) with comments on Semiricinula from NW Borneo. Vita Malacologica. 15: 77–104
 Houart, R.; Kilburn, R. N. & Marais, A. P. (2010). Muricidae. pp. 176–270, in: Marais A.P. & Seccombe A.D. (eds), Identification guide to the seashells of South Africa. Volume 1. Groenkloof: Centre for Molluscan Studies. 376 pp.

External links
 H. M. D. de. (1832). Disposition méthodique des espèces récentes et fossiles des genres Pourpre, Ricinule, Licorne et Concholépas de M. de Lamarck, et description des espèces nouvelles ou peu connues, faisant partie de la collection du Muséum d'Histoire Naturelle de Paris. Nouvelles Annales du Muséum d'Histoire Naturelle. 1: 189–263, pls 9–12.
 Dall, W. H. (1923). Notes on Drupa and Morula. Proceedings of the Academy of Natural Sciences, Philadelphia. 75: 303–306.

Semiricinula
Gastropods described in 1832